Limited overs cricket, also known as one-day cricket or white ball cricket, is a version of the sport of cricket in which a match is generally completed in one day. There are a number of formats, including List A cricket (8-hour games), Twenty20 cricket (3-hour games), and 100-ball cricket (2.5 hours). The name reflects the rule that in the match each team bowls a set maximum number of overs (sets of 6 legal balls), usually between 20 and 50, although shorter and longer forms of limited overs cricket have been played.

The concept contrasts with Test and first-class matches, which can take up to five days to complete. One-day cricket is popular with spectators as it can encourage aggressive, risky, entertaining batting, often results in cliffhanger endings, and ensures that a spectator can watch an entire match without committing to five days of continuous attendance.

Structure

Each team bats only once, and each innings is limited to a set number of overs, usually fifty in a One Day International and between forty and sixty in a List A. List A is a classification of the limited-overs (one-day) form of cricket, technically as the domestic level.

Despite its name, important one-day matches, international and domestic, often have two days set aside, the second day being a "reserve" day to allow more chance of the game being completed if a result is not possible on the first day (for instance if play is prevented or interrupted by rain).

Tiebreaker 

In some tied limited-overs games, a Super Over is played, wherein each team bats for a one-over innings with two wickets in hand. A tied Super Over may be followed by another Super Over.

Player restrictions

Bowling restrictions

In almost all competitive one-day games, a restriction is placed on the number of overs that may be bowled by any one bowler. This is to prevent a side playing two top-class bowlers with extremely good stamina who can bowl throughout their opponents' innings. The usual limitation is set so that a side must include at least five players who bowl i.e. each bowler can only bowl 20% of the overs. For example, the usual limit for twenty-over cricket is four overs per bowler, for forty-over cricket eight per bowler and for fifty-over cricket ten per bowler. There are exceptions: Pro Cricket in the United States restricted bowlers to five overs each, thus leaving a side requiring only four bowlers.

Fielding restrictions

White balls 

Limited over cricket is usually played with white balls rather than the traditional red balls.  This was introduced because the team batting second is likely to need to play under floodlights and a white ball is easier to see under these conditions.  The white balls are supposed to be otherwise identical to traditional balls, but according to BBC Sport, some cricketers claim that the harder surface causes white balls to swing more.

History
The idea for a one-day, limited 50-over cricket tournament, was first played in the inaugural match of the All India Pooja Cricket Tournament in 1951 at Tripunithura in Kochi, Kerala. It is thought to be the brain child of KV Kelappan Thampuran, a former cricketer and the first Secretary of the Kerala Cricket Association. The first limited-overs tournament between first-class English teams was the Midlands Knock-Out Cup, which took place in May 1962. Played with 65-over innings, the Cup was organised by Mike Turner, secretary of the Leicestershire County Cricket Club. The competition was small, with three other county teams participating in addition to Leicestershire. However, it drew commercial television coverage and positive commentary by journalists, who noted the potential to attract sponsors and spectators amid declining attendance levels.

The following year, the first full-scale one-day competition between first-class teams was played, the knock-out Gillette Cup, won by Sussex. The number of overs was reduced to 60 for the 1964 season. League one-day cricket also began in England, when the John Player Sunday League was started in 1969 with 40-over matches. Both these competitions have continued every season since inauguration, though the sponsorship has changed. There is now one 50-over competition, which is called the Royal London One-Day Cup.

The first Limited Overs International (LOI) or One-Day International (ODI) match was played in Melbourne in 1971, and the quadrennial cricket World Cup began in 1975. Many of the "packaging" innovations, such as coloured clothing, were as a result of World Series Cricket, a "rebel" series set up outside the cricketing establishment by Australian entrepreneur Kerry Packer. For more details, see History of cricket.

Twenty20, a curtailed form of one-day cricket with 20 overs (120 legal balls) per side, was first played in England in 2003. It has proven very popular, and several Twenty20 matches have been played between national teams. It makes several changes to the usual laws of cricket, including the use of a Super Over (one or more additional overs played by each team) to decide the result of tied matches.

100-ball cricket (2.5-hour games), another form of one-day cricket with 100 deliveries per side, launched in England in 2021. It is designed to further shorten game time and to attract a new audience. It makes further changes to the usual laws of cricket, such as the involvement of overs that last 5 balls each.

There are now also T10 leagues with a format of 10 overs per side (resulting in 90-minute games). The Emirates Cricket Board also launched Ninety–90 Bash, an upcoming annual franchise-based 90-ball cricket league in the United Arab Emirates.

One Day Internationals

One Day International matches are usually played in brightly coloured clothing often in a "day-night" format where the first innings of the day occurs in the afternoon and the second occurs under stadium lights.

One Day International tournaments 

In the early days of ODI cricket, the number of overs was generally 60 overs per side, and matches were also played with 40, 45 or 55 overs per side, but now it has been uniformly fixed at 50 overs.

Every four years, the Cricket World Cup involves all the Test-playing nations and other national sides who qualify through the ICC World Cup Qualifier. It usually consists of round-robin stages, followed by semi-finals and a final.  The International Cricket Council (ICC) determines the venue far in advance.

The ICC Champions Trophy involves all the Test-playing nations, and is held between World Cups. It usually consists of a round-robin group stage, semifinals, and a final.

Each Test-playing country often hosts triangular tournaments, between the host nation and two touring sides. There is usually a round-robin group , and then the leading two teams play each other in a final, or sometimes a best-of-three final. When there is only one touring side, there is still often a best-of-five or best-of-seven series of limited overs matches.

The ICC World Cricket League is an ODI competition for national teams with Associate or Affiliate status.

List A status

List A cricket is a classification of the limited-overs (one-day) form of the sport of cricket. Much as domestic first-class cricket is the level below international Test match cricket, so List A cricket is the domestic level of one-day cricket below One Day Internationals. Twenty20 matches do not qualify for the present.

Most cricketing nations have some form of domestic List A competition. The number of overs in List A cricket ranges from forty to sixty overs per side.

The Association of Cricket Statisticians and Historians created this category for the purpose of providing an equivalent to first-class cricket, to allow the generation of career records and statistics for comparable one-day matches. Only the more important one-day competitions in each country, plus matches against a touring Test team, are included. The categorisation of cricket matches as "List A" was not officially endorsed by the International Cricket Council until 2006, when the ICC announced that it and its member associations would be determining this classification in a manner similar to that done for first class matches.

Matches that qualify as List A:
 One Day Internationals (ODIs)
 Other international matches
 Premier one-day tournaments in each country
 Official matches of a touring Test team against main first-class teams

Matches that do not qualify as List A:
 World Cup warm-up matches
 Other Tourist matches (for example, against first-class teams that are not part of the main domestic first-class competition, such as universities)
 Festival and friendly matches

Domestic competitions
Domestic one-day competitions exist in almost every country where cricket is played. The table below lists the limited overs tournaments that take place in each full member nation.

One-day records

The world record for the highest innings total in any List A limited overs match is 496 for 4 by Surrey against Gloucestershire in their Friends Provident Trophy 50-overs match at the Oval, London on 29 April 2007. That surpassed the 443 for nine by Sri Lanka against the Netherlands in their One Day International 50-overs match at Amstelveen on 4 July 2006, which was the record ODI score at the time. On 19 June 2018, England set a new international record, totalling 481 for 6 against Australia at Trent Bridge. The lowest ever total is 23 by Yorkshire against Middlesex at Headingley in 1974 in a 40-overs match. The record low score in ODIs was set by Zimbabwe, who managed just 35 against Sri Lanka in Harare on 25 April 2004.

The most runs scored by both sides in any List A limited overs match is 872: Australia, batting first, scored 434 for four in 50 overs, and yet were beaten by South Africa who scored 438 for nine with a ball to spare during their One Day International at Johannesburg in 2006.

The highest individual innings is 268 by Ali Brown for Surrey against Glamorgan in a 50-overs match at The Oval in 2002. The best bowling figures are eight for 15 by Rahul Sanghvi for Delhi against Himachal Pradesh in a 50-overs match at Una in 1997. The highest international individual innings is by Rohit Sharma who scored 264. The highest score in any formal limited overs match is believed to be United's 630 for five against Bay Area in a 45 overs match at Richmond, California in August 2006.

The most runs in an over was scored by Herschelle Gibbs of the South African cricket team when, in the 2007 Cricket World Cup in the West Indies, he hit 6 sixes in one over bowled by Daan van Bunge of the Netherlands.

This record is shared by Yuvraj Singh of India who achieved this feat in the 2007 ICC World Twenty20 in South Africa, he hit 6 sixes in an over bowled by Stuart Broad of England.

Sachin Tendulkar holds the record of being the first male cricketer to score a double century in ODIs (200 not out). He achieved this feat against South Africa on 24 February 2010, at Gwalior, India. Virender Sehwag is the second male cricketer to score a double century, when he scored 219 before being caught out against West Indies on 8 December 2011, at Indore, India. Rohit Sharma became the third male cricketer to score a double century, when he scored 209 against Australia on 2 November 2013.

See also
 T10 League
 Duckworth–Lewis–Stern method

References

Sources